Choi Bae-young (born January 22, 1990) is a South Korean actress.

Watching Korean dramas with her grandmother when she was a child, she grew interested in arts and entertainment, and dreamed of being an actress or a film director. When she was in high school, her father suggested her to try acting. She then enrolled in the Acting Department of the Korea National University of Arts and started auditioning, at first without an agency.

She made her debut through several theater and independent films, and drew attention in 2015 with her role in Great Stories: Kim Sisters. In April 2016 she became an ambassador for Friends of Hope.

Filmography

Television series

Film

References

External links

South Korean television actresses
South Korean film actresses
Korea National University of Arts alumni
1990 births
Living people
DSP Media artists